Lucio Maria Attinelli (born on 4 August 1933 in Palermo, Sicily) is a journalist and an Italian writer.

Biography 
As a journalist, Lucio Maria Attinelli has been the correspondent of the Italian periodicals in Paris: Il Mondo, La Fiera Letteraria, L’Europeo, Gente.

With Italo Calvino, Dino Buzzati, Stefan Themerson, André Pieyre de Mandiargues amongst others, he has collaborated in the international literary review Il Caffé, created and managed by G. Vicari.

His encounters with Ezra Pound, Julio Cortázar, Alberto Giacometti, Jean Genet and his letters to the Editor in Paris during May 1968 in France were used as references in Italy.

He has collaborated in France to the daily newspapers Le Figaro and Combat as well as to the literary review Les cahiers des saisons, managed by Jacques Brenner and Bernard Frank.

Lucio Maria Attinelli was a senior official of diplomatic rank in the UNESCO. From 1962 to 1991 he successively holds the high offices of Assistant to the Information Department Editor- in-Chief, Deputy Co-ordinator of the « United Nations’ project for the integral study of the Silk Roads, Roads of dialogue » and finally he initiated and lead the Public Relations and Special Events Division till he left the Organization. Within this scope we owe him, between others initiatives, the media launching of the Worldwide campaign for the Venice safeguard.  Vermeil Medal (1976).

Lucio Maria Attinelli, whose characteristic is to write directly in French, is author of many cinema scenarii, two anthologies of poems, a few tales and seven novels.

Works 
 Les Barons de Palerme, Acropole, 1982.
 Ouverture Sicilienne, Robert Laffont, 1992, et Le Livre de Poche, 1997.
 La Gondole Blanche, Robert Laffont, 1994.
 La chute de l’épervier, Robert Laffont, 1997, et Le Livre de Poche, 1998.
 Une saison sicilienne, Flammarion, 2000.
 Paradis d’Orages, Fayard, 2003.
 Un Sicilien à Paris, Fayard, 2005.
 For the André Sauret Publishing he wrote the French version of Giorgio Soavi: Giacometti.
 Parfum de Sicile, Amazon, 2020.
 Vertige, Amazon, 2020.
 Un jour Shéhérazade, Amazon, 2021.

Filmography 
 1972 : Les Voraces from Sergio Gobbi with Helmut Berger, Françoise Fabian and Paul Meurice, Script : Lucio Attinelli and Vahé Katcha
 1975 : Blondy from Sergio Gobbi with Bibi Andersson and Rod Taylor, Script and dialogues : Lucio Attinelli

Literary Prizes 
 Talamone Prize in 1983 with Leonardo Sciascia for his literary activities;
 In 2003 finalist for the international prize « Ostia/Roma », under the auspices of the President of the Italian Republic, for his novel Una stagione a Palermo (Sellerio, publisher).

International Commitment 
Lucio Maria Attinelli has been the creator and general co-ordinator of the thoughts and studies program Unesco-Nouveau Millénaire at the origin of the Declaration of Human Duties and Responsibilities at which were participating : Umberto Eco, Michel Serres from the Académie Française, Maurice Aymard from the Maison des sciences de l’homme, Dario Fo, Nobel Prize for Literature, Arthur Miller, Sir Peter Ustinov and Wole Soyinka, Nobel Prize for Literature, Adolfo Perez Esquivel, Nobel Prize for Peace.

In 1990 the UNESCO presented him the instrument of "High recognition for his 28 years ‘contribution to the international Cooperation and Peace".

Visual Arts 
Recently, partly quitting his literary activity, Lucio Maria Attinelli has devoted on painting and sculpture. The expert view is that his works, inspired by the « Soul Art » of which he takes his inspiration from, are successfully accomplished. Between these let's quote:
 Hommage à Marilyn
 11 septembre
 Mai 68 et le suivant
 Aphrodite now
 Phéromones connexion
 Phéromones explosion
 C’era una volta Roma
 S.d. B : La deuxième vie du deuxième sexe

Notes and references 

1933 births
Living people
Journalists from Palermo